Ehrl is a German surname. Notable people with the surname include:

 Andreas Ehrl (born 1965), German water polo player
 Wolfgang Ehrl (1912–1980), German wrestler

See also 
 Ehrling

German-language surnames